MV Ramsey was a coastal cargo vessel built for the Isle of Man Steam Packet Company in 1964. She was the last vessel specially built to serve the smaller ports of the Island.

Construction & Dimensions

Ramsey was built by Ailsa Shipbuilding Company at Troon, Scotland, at a cost of £158,647.

Work commenced in 1964, and was completed by spring 1965. Ramsey had a length of 149'; beam 28'; depth 12'1" and a speed of 10 knots. The vessel's tonnage was 446 gross register tons, and she was fitted with a six-cylinder British Polar engine developing 490 brake horsepower, with crew accommodation for 18.

Service life
In the early 1970s containerization resulted in a marked upsurge in freight business. In 1973 alone, there was a 31 per cent rise in cargo.

However, the majority of cargo shipping soon switched to containers, and given Ramseys deficiencies in handling containerized cargoes, it became apparent that a second container vessel would be needed to expedite matters. One was chartered and later bought, .

Gallery

Disposal and subsequent use
Though able to carry the old wooden containers, Ramseys hold design made it difficult to load and unload her efficiently. In early 1973, the Isle of Man Steam Packet Company decided that the Ramsey would not be suitable for conversion to take modern containers, and at the end of that year she was put up for sale. Ramsey was sold to R. Lapthorn and Co. of Hoo, Rochester, Kent. There was some controversy surrounding the withdrawal of the weekly freight service to the Isle of Man, and that Ramsey was sold for less than her valuation.

Renamed the Hoofort, she began trading around the south coast of England until acquired by Teodore Jose Nasciamento, Cape Verde Islands in 1982.

This company then operated her under the name Boa Entrada until 1990, converting her to an oil tanker and using her to supply liquid fuel and bottled gas on behalf of ENACOL, the state fuel company. She was again sold in 1990, this time to Soc Exportes Industrie E Mar. Ltd, Cape Verde Islands, and renamed Arquipelago.

Notes

References

 
 
 

1964 ships
Ships of the Isle of Man Steam Packet Company
Ferries of the Isle of Man
Ships built on the River Clyde